The Chester Bridge is a continuous truss bridge connecting Missouri's Route 51 with Illinois Route 150 across the Mississippi River between Perryville, Missouri and Chester, Illinois.  It is the only motor-traffic bridge spanning the Mississippi River between St. Louis and Cape Girardeau, Missouri.

History 
Located at river mile marker 109.5, the Chester Bridge is a two-lane traffic truss bridge which was constructed by Sverdrup and Parcel and Associates, Inc. of St. Louis, Missouri.  Construction began in 1941 and was finished in 1942 at a cost of $1.385 million (1942 dollars).
The bridge opened on August 23, 1942, and operated as a toll bridge until January 1, 1989.  The main span was destroyed by a severe tornadic force thunderstorm on July 29, 1944, and reconstructed 2 years later.  The bridge serves about 6,400 vehicles per day.

Up to 1989, a toll was charged for crossing the bridge.

Inspections in 2020 showed the bridge structure to be "functionally obsolete" and in poor condition, imposing a weight limit of 25 tons. The Missouri Department of Transportation plans to replace the bridge by 2028.

Chester Welcome Center 

The Chester Welcome Center is located in Segar Park next to the Chester Bridge and overlooks the Mississippi River.  The park was dedicated to E. C. Segar who was born on December 8, 1894, in Chester, Illinois.  Segar is most noted for his cartoon comic "Popeye” which he created in 1929 from his recollections of a local scrapper on the Mississippi River.  A six-foot “life-size” bronze statue of Popeye stands near the bridge.

Popular culture
The Chester Bridge can be seen in the 1967 film In the Heat of the Night, although in the film a highway sign for the (non-existent) "Arkansas 49" highway appears on the east (Illinois) side of the bridge.

Gallery

See also 
List of crossings of the Upper Mississippi River

References

External links 
 Historic Bridges of the U.S. | Chester Bridge | Randolph County, Illinois and Perry County, Missouri

Continuous truss bridges in the United States
Road bridges in Illinois
Bridges over the Mississippi River
Bridges completed in 1942
Buildings and structures in Perry County, Missouri
Road bridges in Missouri
Great River Road
Former toll bridges in Illinois
Former toll bridges in Missouri
1942 establishments in Illinois
Interstate vehicle bridges in the United States
Perryville, Missouri
Transportation in Perry County, Missouri
Transportation in Randolph County, Illinois
Buildings and structures in Randolph County, Illinois
1942 establishments in Missouri